Salah Abdeslam (born 15 September 1989) is a French Islamic terrorist who was sentenced to life in prison in 2022 as the sole surviving member of the 10-man unit that carried out the attacks in Paris on 13 November 2015 in which 130 people were killed and more than 490 injured.

Born in Belgium, Abdeslam worked various jobs in his home city of Brussels. He committed several acts of street and petty crimes in Brussels, as well as drug offences. Abdeslam became radicalised into militant Islamism by his friend Abdelhamid Abaaoud, who had returned to Belgium after taking part in terrorist activities in Syria, causing Abdeslam to stop activities like drinking alcohol and turn more religiously strict. He eventually took part in the deadly November 2015 attacks in Paris through providing logistical support for the assailants, driving them to their target locations, and having some involvement in the manufacture of the explosives used. Having evaded authorities, he became the target of one of the largest manhunts in modern European history. Europol had Abdeslam as first in a list of wanted criminals out of 57 individuals listed publicly by the organisation in January 2016.

Abdeslam is known to have had contacts or social links to the Islamic State of Iraq and the Levant (ISIL), as ISIL subsequently made a claim of responsibility for the attack. Of the men known to be involved in the attacks, he and Mohammad Abrini are the only two still alive; all others involved either having killed themselves or having been killed by French police officers. After about four months on the run, Abdeslam was apprehended on 18 March 2016, following a shootout that occurred during a police raid conducted in the Molenbeek area of Brussels. On 23 April, Abdeslam was sentenced in Brussels to 20 years in prison for the shootout.

On 9 February 2022, Abdeslam testified in France for the first time and claimed he did not kill or hurt anyone. He denied he was a danger to the public. He restated his support for the Islamic State in court but said he decided not to detonate his explosives at the last minute. He faced more cross-examination; the trial was expected to last nine months. On 29 June 2022, Abdeslam was found guilty on all five counts he was charged with, including terrorism and murder; he was sentenced to life imprisonment without parole. Facing poor prospects on appeal, he announced he would not challenge the decision.

Personal background
Salah Abdeslam was born on 15 September 1989 in Brussels, Belgium. His parents are immigrants who were living in Bouyafar, a small village in northern Morocco, before emigration. Though the Abdeslams lived in Belgium from the 1960s, they were all French nationals, having acquired French nationality from the time the parents lived in French Algeria .

Abdeslam and Abdelhamid Abaaoud were friends as children, when both were living in Sint-Jans-Molenbeek. Another childhood friend stated that Abdeslam liked football and motorbikes. According to a woman to whom Abdeslam was briefly engaged in 2011, he and Abaaoud continued to be close friends into adulthood. Following his arrest, Abdeslam claimed he met Abaaoud on only one occasion.

Abdeslam was employed by STIB-MIVB as a mechanic from September 2009 to 2011. His employment was discontinued in January 2011; one source states his employment was terminated due to his repeated absences, but Abdeslam's ex-fiancée stated that his employment was terminated due to an act or multiple acts of crime, for which he was subsequently sentenced to one month in jail.

From December 2013, Abdeslam was the manager of a bar named Les Béguines in Molenbeek, located west of Brussels, after his brother Brahim took over the license. Most of the bar's customers were of Maghrebian origin. The bar was closed when authorities discovered that hallucinogenic substances were being used there. He and his brother sold the bar about six weeks before the attacks.

Abdeslam was already known to police authorities as a person involved in petty crime. Another source claimed both he and Abaaoud were imprisoned for armed robbery in 2010. According to a lawyer representing Abaaoud, his client and Abdeslam were arrested in December 2010 for attempting to break into a parking garage.

In February 2011, Abaaoud and Abdeslam were convicted at a Nivelles court for two acts of theft committed in December 2010 at Ottignies and Rixensart. Their respective sentences were both suspended. At the same time, Abdeslam was convicted for breaking and entering. Abdeslam was convicted of theft again in February 2014 and fined €250, relating to an act he committed in 2012. In February 2015, he was arrested by Dutch police and charged for possession of cannabis. He was subsequently fined €70.

Abdeslam collected €19,000 in unemployment benefits from the Belgian government until a few weeks before the Paris attacks. Because he was gainfully employed at the time, he should have been ineligible for those benefits.

After Abdeslam was tied to the attacks, various newspapers visited bars in Brussels's gay village, and reported that some bartenders there identified him as a frequent patron. The Sunday Times published a widely quoted comment from "Julien", a bartender who recognized Abdeslam as a patron; he said that he and his colleagues had speculated he was a "rent boy". Other reporters speculated that Abdeslam was not necessarily gay, and that his visits to the gay bars may have been to gauge when and where the bars were most vulnerable as potential targets for bombing attacks.

Preceding the attacks
A woman Abdeslam was engaged to at the time of the attacks stated that he became radicalized from the influence of Abaaoud, after Abaaoud had returned from a period of terrorist activity in Syria sometime in 2014. According to a number of sources, several months before the attacks, both Salah and Brahim Abdeslam had quit drinking alcohol and smoking cigarettes and began to pray devoutly.

Abdeslam was questioned by police sometime during the first few months of 2015, after a terrorist plot was foiled in Verviers. The plot involved contacts of Abaaoud.

Ahmet Dahmani was with Abdeslam in August 2015, when the two travelled from Italy to Greece and back using a ferry service. Dahmani was arrested on 21 November in Antalya, Turkey, as a member of an ISIL-affiliated Belgian-French network.

Within the nine months preceding the attacks, Abdeslam traveled to six countries, including Germany and Austria, which he visited in October 2015, according to the German Minister of the Interior, Thomas de Maizière. After his arrest and subsequent questioning, the French public prosecutor stated that Abdeslam was traveling throughout the countries as an effort to transport individuals, who would later be involved in the attacks, into Europe.

In October 2015, Abdeslam purchased twelve remote detonators and a number of batteries from a fireworks shop in St-Ouen-l'Aumône, Val d'Oise, as well as 15 litres of peroxide. Abdeslam was named on a list of people suspected of involvement in terrorist activities, which was provided to the mayor of Molenbeek by the intelligence services of Belgium on 26 October. The mayor later stated that she did not use the list to track down possible terrorists, adding that it was the responsibility of the federal police.

Le Point reported that Abdeslam used the website booking.com to rent rooms 311 and 312 of the Apart'City hotel in Alfortville, two days before the attacks. Police found, among other things, syringes, pizza, and chocolate cake in the room. DNA traces indicated Abdeslam shared the room with others. According to another source, the rooms were apparently booked from 11 to 17 November. A man named Mohamed Abrini was seen with Abdeslam on video footage recovered by police from 11 November. In the footage, the two had stopped a black Renault Clio at a petrol station. Abrini drove Abdeslam to Paris on 11 November.

According to statements made to France 2, Salah Abdeslam and his brother Brahim were seen arguing on the night of 12 November.

Involvement in Paris attacks

Abdeslam was allegedly involved in assisting the attackers by hiring cars, flats, and hotel rooms. An unconfirmed source, said to be an associate of Abdeslam, testified that he heard Abdeslam claiming he had shot people in Paris, while he and Abdeslam were driving away from the city after the attacks.

Abdeslam rented a black Volkswagen Polo, which he allegedly used to drive the Bataclan theatre attackers. Both Salah and Brahim Abdeslam were traced to two vehicles, a SEAT and the Volkswagen rented by Salah. Occupants of the car also shot individuals at the Casa Nostra pizza restaurant and the La Belle Équipe cafe. Three male passengers, one of whom was Brahim Abdeslam, killed a number of people using machine guns while they were on terraces of bars in the 10th and 11th arrondissements of Paris. The SEAT León model car was later recovered; Kalashnikov automatic rifles and magazines were found inside. Another report stated that five full and eleven empty magazines were found in the vehicle, along with fingerprint evidence.

Later, forensic analysis of a discarded suicide belt found at rue Frederic Chopin in the Paris suburb of Montrouge found traces of sweat. The DNA of the sweat was compared to DNA samples held by police services for Abdeslam. DNA reportedly found on the discarded belt did not match a sample of Abdeslam's DNA obtained by police.

Escape
Abdeslam bought a SIM card at the Place Albert Kahn in the 18th arrondissement at about 22:00 hours. He phoned a detainee at Namur prison, Abdheila Chouaa, who was closely acquainted with Mohamed Abrini. Abdeslam then made a phone call to associates in Brussels, requesting they drive to him in order to help him escape. He was heard crying at the time of the call. He wandered the streets for a period of approximately seven to nine hours until he was collected at approximately 07:00 hours. A data trace of the aforementioned call shows Abdeslam was in Montrouge at the time, and that the call was transmitted by a cell tower in Châtillon, likely either Châtillon-la-Borde or Châtillon, Hauts-de-Seine.

Salah was subsequently collected while he was near the Boulevard Barbès in the 18th arrondissement of Paris; Hamza Attou and Mohammed Amri were subsequently arrested because they drove Abdeslam after the shootings, and were charged with participating in a terrorist act by the Belgian authorities.

The vehicle carrying Abdeslam, Attou, and Amri was stopped by officers at Cambrai en route to Belgium, but allowed to continue because there was no evidence of Abdeslam's involvement in the attacks at the time. According to the Belgian interior minister, Jan Jambon, a database at the police checkpoint began showing details on Abdeslam fifteen minutes after his departure from the checkpoint. The officers at the checkpoint were also distracted by the smell of marijuana, which had earlier been smoked by Attou and Amri.

They dropped Abdeslam at a shopping centre where he bought a new pair of jeans, a jacket and cap, stuffing his old clothes into a rubbish bin. He then bought a new phone and got a new hairstyle from a barbershop. An acquaintance, Ali Oulkadi, dropped him off in Schaerbeek. Abdeslam was believed to have briefly stayed at the flat of Ayoub Bazarouj at some point after arriving in Belgium. Bazarouj was arrested on 16 November and his flat was searched; the search recovered ten mobile phones.

Ali Oulkadi, who was detained by Brussels police, provided assistance to Abdeslam by driving him to another part of Brussels on 14 November. Oulkadi claimed he received a phone call from someone requesting him to drive someone to an unspecified location. He stated he was unaware at the time the person was Abdeslam. Oulkadi drove to Laeken, where he found Abdeslam and the caller. Oulkadi and Abdeslam went to a café where a brief verbal exchange ensued on the events of Paris. Afterwards, Abdeslam was given directions to Schaerbeek.

Manhunt
French and Belgian authorities released Abdeslam's photo and name on 15 November 2015. Abdeslam's brother Mohammed gave a televised message to his brother, urging him to turn himself in if he was involved in the attacks.

On 9 or 10 December, police entered an apartment at 86 Rue Berge in the Schaerbeek district of Brussels, which had been rented under a false name. Police found, among other things, a fingerprint belonging to Abdeslam, traces of an explosive known as TATP, and three handmade belts. Abdeslam journeyed to the Henri Bergé flat on 14 November, and later departed apparently after two searches were made by police within the area on 4 December.

In December 2015, a police dossier was made on a person suspected of having been radicalized and living in the same Rue des Quatre Vents flat. However, it was not passed to the relevant authority because, according to the Mechelen chief of police, an officer of his team had forgotten to do so. The Mechelen police had previously received information from Abid Aberkan, a nephew of Abdeslam, who told officers that he thought his uncle might be hiding in Mechelen. The flat Abdeslam was discovered in was occupied by members of Aberkan's family.

At 10:00 on 16 December, Belgian police entered a location where Abdeslam was believed to have been hiding. It was reported that the authorities were unable to enter the location during the previous day because of a Belgian law that prohibited officers from forcibly entering a home between the hours of 21:00 and 05:00, except for situations where services were acting to apprehend criminals suspected of specific crimes. In addition, the authorities had to wait in order to eliminate the risk towards children at a school and 200–300 worshipers at a mosque, both close to the location.

New images of Abdeslam were released by the French media on 11 January 2016. The images were taken from a petrol station located at Trith-Saint-Léger and dated to the morning after the attacks.

On 25 January 2016, it was reported that ISIL videos released to the public showed footage of nine persons involved in the attacks, all of whom are now deceased. No footage of Abdeslam was featured.

On 15 March 2016, police conducted an anti-terrorist raid on a flat in Forest where Abdeslam was believed to have been staying at one point. Though they expected the flat to be empty, they were fired upon by Mohamed Belkaid, an accomplice of Abdeslam's. Before being shot and killed by a police sniper, Belkaid provided suppressive fire while Abdeslam and another accomplice escaped the flat through the rooftops. A trace of DNA belonging to Abdeslam was later found in the apartment, as well as detonators an automatic rifle, eleven rifle magazines, and a book of Salafism, a so-called fundamentalist movement of Islam. The Forest flat had been rented by Khalid El Bakraoui, one of the suicide bombers involved in the 2016 Brussels bombings, under a false name.

Following their escape from the flat, Abdeslam and the other man phoned an associate who was being monitored by Belgian police, allowing authorities to make preparations for a second raid.

Capture

On 18 March 2016, Abdeslam was arrested in an anti-terror police raid on a flat occupied by the Aberkan family, located at 79 Rue des Quatre Vents of Molenbeek in Brussels, close to the location of his childhood home.

The raid started at approximately 16:30 hours (CET), about an hour after Belgian prosecutors confirmed that they had found Abdeslam's fingerprint in an apartment in the Forest area of Brussels. He was captured at about 19:00 hours (CET). On 16 April, the Interior Minister of Belgium, Jan Jambon, stated that protesters "threw stones and bottles at police and press" during Abdeslam's arrest.

During the raid, Abdeslam was shot through the leg and captured. Sources conflict as to whether he was shot while fleeing from police officers or charging towards them in an apparent attempt to commit suicide by cop. He was subsequently taken to Saint Peters Hospital in Brussels for treatment, where he was kept for a little under eight hours. He had managed to evade capture for approximately 126 days. Abdeslam was unarmed at the time of his arrest.

According to a reporter based in Brussels, a spokesman for the Paris prosecutor's office stated Abdeslam's capture was made due to a combination of "telephony and surveillance". A second source stated that suspicion was apparently aroused to the location after a person in the flat made an unusually large pizza order. When officers arrived at the scene, they found the woman who made the food order with two other adults, children, and Abdeslam.

Another suspect, identified as Monir Ahmed Alaaj, was injured during the raid. Several other people were arrested, including Alaaj and three of Abdeslam's relatives.

A third suspect, identified as 24-year-old Belgian citizen Najim Laachraoui, escaped. Laachraoui's DNA was found on a piece of cloth and a suicide vest found inside the Bataclan theatre, as well as a device detonated at the Stade de France. Laachraoui was later identified as a suicide bomber at Brussels Airport. Abdeslam later stated during questioning he had driven the vehicle to the Stade de France attacks.

Detention and legal proceedings
Abdeslam was moved from hospital to Brussels' police headquarters and charged, and subsequently transferred to maximum security imprisonment in a Bruges jail on the night of 19 March. According to a spokeswoman for prisons of Belgium, he was placed into an area of the prison known as the "Individual and Special Safety" wing. The area of the prison was built for those "people who pose an escape risk and those with behavioural problems in the normal prison".

The French government made a request for Abdeslam to be extradited from Belgium, which Abdeslam did not oppose. A Belgian federal prosecutor charged Abdeslam with "participation in terrorist murder and participation in the activities of a terrorist organization". He was due to appear in a Belgian court on 24 March.

Abeslam was initially interviewed at 07:00 hours (GMT) on the day after his arrest. He confessed to planning new operations in Brussels and having access to several heavy weapons. A second interview was made on 22 March following the Brussels bombings, as it was believed by some that Abdeslam may have intended to take part in them. Abdeslam claimed he had no prior knowledge of the attacks or anyone who intended to be involved in them.

During questioning, Salah Abeslam confirmed that he had rented the cars and hotels used before the attacks, and that he had driven the three suicide bombers who attacked the Stade de France. He stated that his brother Brahim had asked him to become involved in the Paris attacks, and had provided the funds that Salah used to rent the rooms and vehicles for himself and other members of the terrorist cell. In addition, he stated that Brahim gave him a suicide belt in Bobigny. However, he appeared to try to diminish his actual role in the attacks.

When presented with a photograph of Ibrahim and Khalid El Bakraoui, two brothers involved in the Brussels bombings, and asked if he knew who they were, he denied knowing them. However, public prosecutors in Belgium stated Ibrahim and Khalid El Bakraoui had provided a safe house for individuals involved in the Paris attacks.

In total, Abdeslam was interrogated for less than two hours between the time of his arrest and the Brussel bombings, because "[h]e seemed very tired and he had been operated on the day before", according to a senior Belgian security official.

Sven Mary, Abdeslam's lawyer, reportedly would try to have his sentence reduced on the grounds of his client being willing to act as an informant.

The office of the Belgian prosecutor stated that Abdeslam will be transferred to France. Some time after his arrest, Abdeslam was represented by a second lawyer, who reported that his client confirmed his willingness to be transferred, but otherwise refused to speak on any other subject.

On 5 April 2016, Mary stated that he had received instructions from the Dutch Brussels Bar Association to cease making any communications to the press regarding Abdeslam, unless he had been given permission to do so by the Associations president.

On 21 April 2016, Abdeslam was charged with attempted murder in relation to the shootout during the 15 March police raid that he escaped from. The shootout had left four police officers injured. On 27 April 2016, he was secretly extradited to France and transported to Paris, where he was charged with participating in a terrorist organization, terrorist murder and attempted murder, attempted terrorist murder of public officials, hostage-taking, and weapons and explosives possession. He was imprisoned at Fleury-Mérogis Prison and reappeared in court on 20 May 2016 When he arrived in the prison, other inmates applauded and cheered in support.

In October 2016, Abdeslam's lawyers, including Frank Berton, announced they had resigned due to their client, Abdeslam, refusing to speak to them. Participating in a subsequent court hearing on 29 November 2016, Abdeslam refused to speak in court. Because of his continued refusal to speak, Judge Christopher Teissier decided to enter into the record a letter Abdeslam wrote from prison to a fan on 13 November 2016. The letter is considered his first statement to the court. In it, he described himself as "a Muslim subject to Allah." Abdeslam reportedly receives "incessant" mail, with the senders including "French and Belgian women who profess their love and want to bear his child", as well as offers for legal services.

In August 2017, Belgian authorities reportedly wished to have Abdeslam stand trial on the grounds of his alleged involvement in the shooting at police officers during March 2016. In September 2017, Abdeslam wished to aid proceedings in a trial in Brussels, which was set for December.

Verdicts

In a court hearing in Brussels during February 2018, a latest date for a verdict in the trial on the 15 March 2016 Forest (Brussels) shootout was given as being 29 April 2018. Abdeslam and his Tunisian co-defendant Sofien Ayari face 20 years in jail for terror and attempted murder charges. The prosecution found Abdeslam's DNA or fingerprints at five locations in Belgium used by the Brussels ISIL terror cell behind both the November 2015 Paris attacks and 2016 Brussels bombings. Sven Mary, Abdeslam's lawyer, pleads that his client's DNA was not found on the weapons used in the shootout nor did he engage police.

On 23 April 2018, Salah Abdeslam was sentenced in Brussels to 20 years in prison after being found guilty of the attempted murder of police officers in a shootout in Brussels in March 2016. Ayari was also given a 20-year sentence for his role in the shooting.

On June 29, 2022, Abdeslam, along with 19 other other co-defendants, was convicted for his role in the 2015 Paris attacks. Abdeslam, who at this time was also the sole surviving member of the nine main perpetrators of the attacks, has also received a life sentence without parole. He is currently in Haren Prison in Brussels.

References

External links

1989 births
2016 Brussels bombings
21st-century French criminals
Arabs in France
Criminals from Brussels
Fugitives
French male criminals
French murderers
French people of Moroccan descent
Fugitives wanted by France
Fugitives wanted on terrorism charges
Islamic State of Iraq and the Levant members
Islamic terrorism in Belgium
Living people
November 2015 Paris attacks
People from Molenbeek-Saint-Jean
Prisoners and detainees of Belgium
People convicted of attempted murder